is one of the seven wards of Fukuoka City, Japan. Meaning literally "west ward," it is bordered to the east by Sawara-ku, and to the west by Itoshima. As of 2003, it has a population of 173,813 people and an area of 83.81 km2. As of 2016, its population had increased to 206,000 people. It has recently gained additional infrastructure in the form of the Nanakuma Line, in addition to the Fukuoka City Subway and the Chikuhi Line. 

At the time of Fukuoka City's official designation as a City in 1972, Nishi-ku covered an area larger than it does today. On May 1, 1982, Nishi-ku was subdivided into the three smaller wards of Nishi-ku, Sawara-ku and Jōnan-ku.

Facilities

Commerce 
Sky Dream Fukuoka

Notable people
 Yukari Oshima, Japanese actress and martial artist,  popular in Asia (mainly Japan, Hong Kong and the Philippines).

Gallery

See also
 Genkai Island

External links

Wards of Fukuoka